John Michael Burke (born July 1, 2001) is an American chess player who holds the FIDE title of Grandmaster (GM). A chess prodigy, Burke reached an Elo rating of 2601 in September 2015, making him the youngest player ever to reach a rating of 2600 or above.

Chess career
Burke achieved the FIDE Master (FM) title in August 2015, and the International Master (IM) title in April 2016. He was awarded his Grandmaster (GM) title in April 2018.

In January 2018, Burke earned his final GM norm by tying for first place with GM Denis Kadric in the Charlotte Chess Center's Winter 2018 GM Norm Invitational held in Charlotte, North Carolina with an undefeated score of 6.5/9. 

In October 2020, he won the U.S. Junior Championship.

References

External links
 
 
 

2001 births
Living people
American chess players
Chess grandmasters
Place of birth missing (living people)